North Star is a village in Darke County, Ohio, United States. The population was 236 at the 2010 census.

History
North Star was platted in 1852 along the road between Greenville and Celina, approximately midway between the two cities.  Its name was derived from its location on the edge of the Great Black Swamp, as it was the northernmost point in Darke County that was not wetland.

A historic site in the village is St. Louis' Catholic Church.  Built in 1914, it is listed on the National Register of Historic Places.

Geography
North Star is located at  (40.322103, -84.568338).

Demographics

2010 census
As of the census of 2010, there were 236 people, 88 households, and 59 families living in the village. The racial makeup of the village was 100.0% White.

There were 88 households, of which 29.5% had children under the age of 18 living with them, 55.7% were married couples living together, 5.7% had a female householder with no husband present, 5.7% had a male householder with no wife present, and 33.0% were non-families. 28.4% of all households were made up of individuals, and 11.4% had someone living alone who was 65 years of age or older. The average household size was 2.68 and the average family size was 3.36.

The median age in the village was 37 years. 30.1% of residents were under the age of 18; 5.1% were between the ages of 18 and 24; 23.8% were from 25 to 44; 18.7% were from 45 to 64; and 22.5% were 65 years of age or older. The gender makeup of the village was 47.5% male and 52.5% female.

2000 census
As of the census of 2000, there were 209 people, 77 households, and 56 families living in the village. The population density was 401.4 people per square mile (155.2/km2). There were 80 housing units at an average density of 153.7 per square mile (59.4/km2). The racial makeup of the village was 99.52% White and 0.48% Asian.

There were 77 households, out of which 29.9% had children under the age of 18 living with them, 70.1% were married couples living together, 1.3% had a female householder with no husband present, and 26.0% were non-families. 24.7% of all households were made up of individuals, and 14.3% had someone living alone who was 65 years of age or older. The average household size was 2.71 and the average family size was 3.28.

In the village, the population was spread out, with 28.7% under the age of 18, 4.8% from 18 to 24, 24.9% from 25 to 44, 20.6% from 45 to 64, and 21.1% who were 65 years of age or older. The median age was 39 years. For every 100 females, there were 104.9 males. For every 100 females age 18 and over, there were 98.7 males.

The median income for a household in the village was $50,938, and the median income for a family was $57,188. Males had a median income of $35,714 versus $21,719 for females. The per capita income for the village was $17,917. None of the families and 5.4% of the population were living below the poverty line, including no under eighteens and 28.1% of those over 64.

Notable people
 Craig Stammen - Major League Baseball pitcher
 Annie Oakley - Entertainer, Sharpshooter

References

Villages in Ohio
Villages in Darke County, Ohio